Presidential elections were held in the Maldives on 27 September 1968. The election took the form of a referendum on the candidacy of Ibrahim Nasir, who was supported by 97% of voters. The country was declared a republic on 11 November.

Background
A referendum in March had resulted in a large majority (81%) voting in favour of replacing the sultanate with a republic. On 9 September the Majlis held a vote on the presidential candidates, with Nasir receiving 35 votes and Musa Fathi one vote.

In accordance with the constitution, a referendum was subsequently held on Nasir's candidacy.

Results

References

Maldives
1968 in the Maldives
Presidential elections in the Maldives
Referendums in the Maldives
Maldives
Single-candidate elections
September 1968 events in Asia
Election and referendum articles with incomplete results